Domenico Francesco Maria Crivelli  (1793/1796 – 31 December 1856), often referred to simply as Signor Crivelli was an Italian born English opera singer and singing teacher.

Career
He was born in Lombardy, Italy, and came to England in 1817 with his father Gaetano Crivelli (1768–1836), who was then principal tenor at the King's Theatre. His father had studied with Andrea Nozzari and Giuseppe Aprile and later taught the tenor Domenico Donzelli.

Domenico became principal professor of singing at the Royal Academy of Music at its foundation in 1823 and continued there until his death, having taught most of the English opera singers of that period. He died on December 31, 1856, at his home, 71, Upper Norton Street, Portland Place, London. He wrote a method of singing, "L'Arte del Canto" or "The Art of Singing" (1841).

References

External links
Portrait bust in York Gate Collections, Royal Academy of Music

1790s births
1856 deaths
Italian emigrants to the United Kingdom
English opera singers
Italian opera singers
Academics of the Royal Academy of Music
Burials at Kensal Green Cemetery
Italian British musicians
19th-century Italian singers
19th-century English musicians